Fisht Olympic Stadium (Olimpiyskiy Stadion Fisht) is an outdoor stadium in Sochi, Russia. Located in Sochi Olympic Park and named after Mount Fisht, the 40,000-capacity stadium was constructed for the 2014 Winter Olympics and Paralympics, where it served as the venue for their opening and closing ceremonies.

The stadium was originally built as an enclosed facility; it was re-opened in 2016 as an open-air football stadium, to host matches as part of the 2017 FIFA Confederations Cup and 2018 FIFA World Cup when it was known simply as Fisht Stadium.

History
Fisht Olympic Stadium was designed by Global Design Practice Populous and British design consultancy BuroHappold Engineering. The bowl opens to the north, allowing a direct view of the Krasnaya Polyana Mountains, and the upper deck is open to the south, allowing a view of the Black Sea.

The canopy over the Western and Eastern stands is covered with translucent ethylene tetrafluoroethylene. The material offers superior strength and corrosion resistance.
Fisht is a UEFA category 4 stadium.

 The architectural design was developed by Populous, a company with previous experience in designing similar facilities for Johannesburg.
 2007. Sochi was elected as host of the 2014 Winter Olympics by the International Olympic Committee.
 2010. Construction of the Fisht Stadium began. The Architect of the stadium is Damon Lavelle. A symbolic capsule was planted bearing the message “Believe in yourself, and together we will win” and marking the start of construction.
 2011. The initial design was altered. According to some sources, changes were made at the request of Director of the Olympics Opening Ceremony Konstantin Ernst.
 2013. Construction of the stadium was completed. The stadium was the last Olympics facility to be commissioned. Having opened in 2013, it cost US$779 million to build the stadium. The stadium complex now serves as a training centre and match venue for the Russia national football team, and served as a site for matches during the 2017 FIFA Confederations Cup and the 2018 FIFA World Cup. The stadium's capacity will be temporarily expanded to 41,220 through temporary seating at the open ends of the stadium. The capacity will be reduced to 40,000 after the World Cup in 2018.
 2014. The opening ceremony of Winter Olympic Games was held in February 2014 followed by the opening and closing ceremonies of the Paralympic Winter Games in March 2014.
 2015. Renovations for the FIFA World Cup started.
 2017. Renovations for the FIFA World Cup were completed.
 2018. The capacity was reduced to 40,000 after the World Cup.

Location and access
Fisht Stadium is located in Sochi, in the Sochi Olympic Park in Adler, south of the Sochi Airport, at 15 Olympic Avenue.
The Fisht Stadium can be reached by buses 57, 117, 125, 134, 173. A suburban electric train Sochi–Adler–Olympic Park also provides access to the stadium.

Safety and security 
By 15 March 2017, the stadium obtained a building safety certificate, detailing its evacuation routes, fire-fighting systems and emergency response procedures. The certificate was a legal confirmation that Fisht was ready to host matches of the FIFA Confederations Cup and 2018 FIFA World Cup. During the 2018 FIFA World Cup matches, the stadium will be served by 2,000 surveillance cameras  and 600 EMERCOM employees will be ensuring the security at Fisht.

Post-Olympics usage 

In January 2015, a 3 billion ruble (US$46 million) project began to renovate the stadium in preparation for the 2017 FIFA Confederations Cup and 2018 FIFA World Cup; among other changes, the closed roof was removed in order to make the stadium compliant with FIFA regulations. The work was expected to be completed by June 2016, but the completion date was pushed back to November 2016.

After the World Cup, FC Dynamo Saint Petersburg of the second division moved from St. Petersburg to Sochi to play in the Fisht Stadium. The team became PFC Sochi, the first professional club in the city since the disbanding of FC Zhemchuzhina-Sochi in 2013.

Commemoration 
In October 2013, the Central Bank of Russia issued a commemorative 100-ruble note to mark 100 days before the opening ceremonies of the 2014 Winter Olympics. The blue-tinted banknote depicts a flying snowboarder on one side, and on the other the Fisht Olympic Stadium and a firebird.

Tournament results

2017 FIFA Confederations Cup

2018 FIFA World Cup

References

External links

 Fisht Stadium
 Fisht Olympic stadium construction

Venues of the 2014 Winter Olympics
2018 FIFA World Cup stadiums
Adlersky City District
Buildings and structures in Sochi
Olympic stadiums
Sport in Sochi
Sports venues in Russia
2017 FIFA Confederations Cup stadiums
Multi-purpose stadiums in Russia
Sports venues completed in 2013
Football venues in Russia
2013 establishments in Russia
Rugby union stadiums in Russia